Lei Yuping (born 24 January 1979) is a Chinese boxer. He competed in the men's light heavyweight event at the 2004 Summer Olympics.

References

1979 births
Living people
Chinese male boxers
Olympic boxers of China
Boxers at the 2004 Summer Olympics
People from Jiangsu
Sportspeople from Jiangsu
Light-heavyweight boxers
21st-century Chinese people